Hartford City can refer to some places in the United States:

Hartford City, Indiana
Hartford City, West Virginia
Hartford, Connecticut
Hartford City FC, a soccer team based in Hartford, Connecticut

See also 
 Hartford (disambiguation)